New Killer America is the debut album by the five-piece nu metal/alternative metal music group Skrape. The album was released on March 20, 2001 via RCA Records.

Background, recording and promotion
Skrape were signed to RCA Records in October 1999, and commenced recording their debut New Killer America in 2000. The songs "Broken Knees",
"Blow Up", "Goodbye", "Kill Control", "Sunshine",  "Waste" and "What You Say" were all rerecorded for the album, having previously appeared on the demo which caught the attention of RCA Records. Regarding the making of the album, guitarist/keyboardist Brian Milner stated in April 2001 "We had most of the songs done and then we did preproduction and met with Ulrich Wild. He came to Orlando where we live and spent a few weeks going over the songs and getting them ready. He was like, ‘Look, this is going to go on a recording forever. This is your first album, so make sure it’s what you want to come out.’ We did a lot of preproduction, worked it out and did what I think is a pretty kickass record." The album had already been completed by the summer of 2000, despite eventually being released in the spring of 2001.

A music video for "Waste" was filmed in 2000. It shows the band performing in a dark venue intercut with gory footage and images of a shooting target. A much rarer video for "What You Say" was also produced in 2001, depicting a live performance intercut with anime scenes.

When asked about the album's title, bassist Pete Sison remarked in a March 2001 interview that "It represents the new generation of kids today. Kids today are more open minded, and are much smarter than we give them credit for at the age of 13. Most parents are blind to this. You have kids hacking computers and shutting down million dollar companies nowadays. That's the new generation — that's the new killer America."

Reception and legacy
It went on to sell only approximately 100,000+ copies in the United States, a relatively low number for a major label act at the time. Despite this, the album was a success in Japan, becoming the twelfth highest selling album of 2001 in the country.

AllMusic's Jeremy Ervins praised the record's "bright and intelligent approach to hard rock" and "mysterious aura", writing "The band's energy seems to be directed toward song craftsmanship; every song flows very nicely and has its own distinct vibe, while sticking to the overall concept of the album. The guitars tends to sound slightly dry and dull from time to time, which can relate to the lack of creative range in the heavy hard rock genre. New Killer America is obviously intended to quell this obstacle, as it does with much style and grace on most tracks -- especially "Sleep," a very melodic tune that, despite its title, really awakens the senses toward the end of the album." In their review, Guitar World stated the album "fuses brutal metallic riffs, Deftones-inspired swirl [and] impassioned growls that evoke Alice in Chains' most painful moments."

The song "What You Say" appeared in the videogame Project Gotham Racing. In 2017, Spin ranked "Waste" as the 29th greatest nu metal song of all time.

Track listing
 "What You Say" – 3:22
 "Waste" – 3:29
 "Goodbye" – 3:27
 "Isolated" – 3:55
 "Rise" – 2:57
 "Sunshine" – 3:59
 "Rake" – 3:18
 "I Know" – 3:53
 "Kill Control" – 4:15
 "Broken Knees" – 4:05
 "Sleep" – 3:22
 "Blow Up" – 4:37

The Japanese version of the album features 2 bonus tracks, "No" and "Virgin"

References

2001 debut albums
Skrape albums
RCA Records albums
Albums produced by Ulrich Wild